John Hugo Wolfgang Gideon Liebeschuetz  (22 June 1927 - 11 July 2022) was a German-born British historian who specialized in late antiquity.

Early life
John Hugo Wolfgang Gideon Liebeschuetz was born in Hamburg on 22 June 1927, the son of historian Hans Liebeschuetz and physician Rahel Plaut. His father was a prominent medievalist who taught at the University of Hamburg. The family had been wealthy, having inherited a large fortune from Wolf's great-grandfather Brach, who amassed wealth trading in Texas and Mexico though much was lost in the German inflation. The Liebeschuetz family was Jewish, and were subjected to increasing persecution following the Adolf Hitler's seizure of power by the Nazis. As a young boy, Liebeschuetz was expelled from junior school because he was Jewish, and was subsequently taught at a very small all-Jewish school. Although his family was able to escape, his teacher was eventually murdered in the Holocaust. His father was twice arrested by the Gestapo and imprisoned in the Sachsenhausen concentration camp after the Kristallnacht of November 1938. The four children had received English lessons since 1934 and were sent to England on December 12. The parents and two grandmothers followed soon after.  The emigration of Hans Liebeschuetz was sponsored by the Warburg Institute, with whom the family had long been closely associated.

After arriving in England, the Liebeschuetz family eventually settled in Epsom. Hans Liebeschuetz taught Latin at a number of schools and after the war he became a lecturer at the University of Liverpool. After his retirement he played an important role in founding the Leo Baeck Institute in London.

Education
Liebeschuetz gained his Higher School Certificate at Whitgift School, Croydon in 1944. He initially intended to study medicine. He performed National Service in the Canal Zone in Egypt, as a sergeant in the Royal Army Educational Corps. Liebeschuetz studied Ancient and Medieval History at University College London , where his teachers included A. H. M. Jones and John Morris. After graduating in 1951, Liebeschuetz took a one-year postgraduate certificate in education at Westminster College London. He later studied for his Ph.D. at University College London. His supervisor was Arnaldo Momigliano, and Liebeschuetz was able to consult T. B. L. Webster and Robert Browning.

Career
After gaining his doctorate, Liebeschuetz worked from 1958 to 1963 as a teacher mainly at Heanor Grammar School, Derbyshire. In 1963, he was appointed Assistant Lecturer at the Classics Department at the University of Leicester, which was then under the leadership of Professor Abraham Wasserstein. In 1972, he published the monograph Antioch: City and Imperial Administration in the Later Roman Empire.

In 1979, he was appointed Professor and Head of the Department of Classical and Archaeological Studies at the University of Nottingham. This position had previously been held by E. A. Thompson. 1979 was also the year of the publishing of his monograph Continuity and Change in Roman Religion, which examined how Roman religion worked and how it was abandoned. In the early 1990s Liebeschuetz became increasingly interested in the role of "barbarians" in the fall of the Western Roman Empire. His Barbarians and Bishops (1990) is concerned with this topic.

Retirement
Liebeschuetz retired in 1992, and was elected a Fellow of the British Academy the same year. In 1993 he was made Member of the Institute for Advanced Study in Princeton, New Jersey and a Fellow of the Royal Society of Arts.

Research
The research of Liebeschuetz has centered on late antiquity, particularly the nature of Roman cities and Roman religion during this time. He argues that Roman religion remained strong well into late antiquity.

More recently, Liebeschuetz has examined the role of "barbarians" in the fall of the Western Roman Empire. Discussing the ethnogenesis model developed by Herwig Wolfram of the Vienna School of History, Liebeschuetz has argued that the Visigoths emerged as a people under the leadership of Alaric I and his successors.  He has further argued that parts of the Getica of Jordanes, such as the account of a Gothic migration from Scandinavia towards the Black Sea, are derived from genuinely Gothic oral traditions. Liebeschuetz maintains that the early Germanic peoples shared closely related language, culture and identity, and considers that the concept of Germanic peoples remains indispensable for scholarship. In the 1990s Liebeschuetz was a participant in the Transformation of the Roman World project, which was sponsored by the European Science Foundation. He felt that many members of this project denied the impact or even existence of Germanic peoples, and also sought to blacklist the traditional idea that the Roman Empire had declined,  Liebeschuetz has argued that these scholars are practicing an ideologically dogmatic and flawed form of scholarship, and manipulating history to promote multiculturalism and European federalism.

Personal life
Liebeschuetz married Margaret Taylor in 1955, with whom he has three daughters and one son and five grandchildren.

Selected bibliography

Citations

Sources

 
 

1927 births
2022 deaths
21st-century British historians
Academics of the University of Leicester
Academics of the University of Nottingham
Classical scholars of the Institute for Advanced Study
Alumni of University College London
Royal Army Educational Corps soldiers
Fellows of the British Academy
Jewish emigrants from Nazi Germany to the United Kingdom
People from Hamburg
20th-century British Army personnel